Harzé Castle is a castle in the village of Harzé in the municipality of Aywaille, Liège Province, Wallonia, Belgium.

History 

Starting in October 1944, during the closing months of World War II in the European theatre, the castle was the headquarters of the United States Army's XVIII Airborne Corps, under the command of Major General Matthew Ridgway. The castle provided Ridgway's headquarters with a strategic location in the Ardennes, close to the German border. That December, the corps played a significant role in halting the 5th Panzer Army of Nazi Germany in the Battle of the Bulge.

Present day
The castle is now a hotel, restaurant, conference center and wedding venue. The site also houses the Museum of Milling and Baking.

References

See also
List of castles in Belgium

Castles in Belgium
Castles in Liège Province
Aywaille